John Prescott Ellis (born February 3, 1953) is a former American journalist and media consultant, and is now a partner in the venture-capital firm Sand Hills Partners. He is a nephew of former President of the United States George H. W. Bush and a first cousin of former President George W. Bush and former Governor of Florida John Ellis "Jeb" Bush.

Family background
Ellis's father was Alexander B. "Sandy" Ellis, an insurance executive in Boston, who studied at Yale University. His  mother is Nancy Walker Bush Ellis, a sister of former President George H. W. Bush. Both Sandy Ellis and George Bush were members of Skull and Bones at Yale. Ellis is married to Susan Smith Ellis, the CEO of (RED).

Career
Ellis was working at Fox News during the 2000 United States presidential election, where it was alleged he called the election for his cousin, George Bush. He later provided CBSNews.com with a copy of a letter he said he sent The New Yorker. In the letter, Ellis writes that he "did not share with [Governor Bush] any of the information that was appearing on our screens" during two afternoon phone calls. The letter says that later in the evening "as actual vote results" came in, Ellis spoke frequently with the Bushes about "what was happening" in several states. According to Ellis, other workers on the decision desk – "most of whom are registered Democrats" – were talking to the Gore campaign. Ellis says that he was ultra-scrupulous because of his relationship. "We obeyed those [rules] more strictly than any other news organization, precisely because my cousin was running for president," Ellis told USA Today.

This controversy was picked up by, among others, Michael Moore in his 2004 film Fahrenheit 9/11.

References

External links
Article on Ellis in the Boston Phoenix
'One Call Too Many?' CBS-article on Ellis during Election Night 
PBS interview with Ellis
The Guardian on Ellis' role in Election night 2000

1953 births
Living people
Bush family
Milton Academy alumni
Harvard University alumni
Yale University alumni
Massachusetts Republicans